Benona Sprague (15 February 1833 – 19 June 1908) was a corporal in the United States Army who was awarded the Medal of Honor for gallantry during the American Civil War. On May 22, 1863, during the Siege of Vicksburg, he led a volunteer storming party against Confederate fortifications. He was issued the Medal of Honor on 10 July 1894.

Personal life 
Sprague was born in Salina, New York, on 15 February 1833, to parents Miron B. Sprague and Sarah Sprague. He was one of six children. He married Martha Elen Cornwell Sprague (1840-1919) and had two sons, Charles M. Sprague (1860-1936) and William H. Sprague (1870-1916). He died on 19 June 1908 at his home in Cheney's Grove, Illinois, and is buried in Riverside Cemetery in Saybrook, Illinois.

Military service 
Sprague served with Company F of the US Army's 116th Illinois Infantry and Company A of the Illinois 1st Light Artillery, entering service at Cheney's Grove. The highest rank he achieved was sergeant. On May 22, 1863, during the Siege of Vicksburg in Mississippi, he led a volunteer storming party of approximately 150 men against Confederate fortifications, of which approximately half were alive at the end of the war. As a survivor of the charge, he was one of four soldiers awarded the Medal of Honor for bravery during the action.

References 

1833 births
1908 deaths
American Civil War recipients of the Medal of Honor
United States Army Medal of Honor recipients
People of New York (state) in the American Civil War